Byeonsan (Uisangbong) is a mountain of Jeollabuk-do, western South Korea. It has an altitude of 509 metres.

See also
 Byeonsan-bando National Park
 List of mountains in Korea

References

Buan County
Mountains of North Jeolla Province
Mountains of South Korea